Arthur Hill (born 28 May 1871, Adelaide, South Australia, died 22 June 1936, Glenelg) was a first-class cricketer.

A member of a Hill family that sported 5 cricketing brothers, including that of Australia captain Clem, Arthur Hill was a right-handed batsman. He played five first-class matches in 4 seasons for South Australia, scoring a total of 121 runs in his only innings.

References

External links
 
 

1871 births
1936 deaths
Australian cricketers
South Australia cricketers
Cricketers from Adelaide